Jalan Tanjung Tualang (Perak state route A15) is a major road in Perak, Malaysia.

List of junctions

Tanjung Tualang